Golden Camera is an award given by more than one organisation:

 Caméra d'Or; an award of the Cannes Film Festival
 Goldene Kamera; an annual German film and television award, awarded by the television magazine Horzu